Heterotheca canescens, common name hoary goldenaster, is a North American species of flowering plant in the family Asteraceae. It has been found in northern Mexico (Nuevo León) and in the Great Plains of the central United States (Colorado, New Mexico, Texas, Oklahoma, and Kansas).

References

External links
USDA Plants Profile for Heterotheca canescens (hoary false goldenaster)
Tropicos.org: Photo of herbarium specimen at Missouri Botanical Garden, collected in Missouri in 1921

canescens
Flora of the Great Plains (North America)
Flora of Northeastern Mexico
Flora of Kansas
Flora of Missouri
Flora of New Mexico
Flora of Nuevo León
Flora of Oklahoma
Flora of Texas
Plants described in 1836
Taxa named by Augustin Pyramus de Candolle
Flora without expected TNC conservation status